The 1961 Australian Tourist Trophy was a motor race open to Sports Cars and invited GT Cars, staged at the Mount Panorama Circuit near Bathurst in New South Wales, Australia on 1 October 1961. It was the fifth in a sequence of annual Australian Tourist Trophy races, and was recognized by the Confederation of Australian Motor Sport as the Australian championship for sports cars. The race was won by Bib Stillwell driving a Cooper Monaco.

Results

Notes
 Attendance: 12,000
 Entries: 43
 Starters: 25
 Finishers: 15
 Race distance: 19 laps – 75 miles  (120 km)
 Winner's race time: 53 minutes 11.9 seconds
 Fastest lap: Bib Stillwell - 2 minutes 44.9 seconds

References

Australian Tourist Trophy
Tourist Trophy
Motorsport in Bathurst, New South Wales